The tropical mabuya (Trachylepis paucisquamis) is a species of skink found in Ivory Coast, Ghana, and Liberia.

References

Trachylepis
Reptiles described in 1978
Taxa named by Marinus Steven Hoogmoed